Teucrium marum, commonly known as cat thyme or kitty crack, is a species of germander. Its small, oval leaves give it a thyme-like appearance, but the musty scent is quite unlike the delicate aroma of thyme. Cat thyme is a mounding, tender perennial with grey-green leaves tipped by fragrant pink flowers in summer.

Teucrium marum is native to Spain and the Western Mediterranean.

Description 
Teucrium marum has oval leaves, broader at the base, downy beneath, with uncut margins. It is in leaf all year. The flowers, appearing between July and September in the northern hemisphere,  are in one-sided spikes, the corollas are crimson in color. The leaves and younger branches when fresh, on being rubbed emit a volatile, pungent, aromatic smell, which excites sneezing, but in taste they are somewhat bitter, accompanied with a sensation of heat.

Teucrium marum will live through the winter in the open, on a dry soil and in a good situation, when the frosts are not severe, though it is frequently killed in hard winters if unprotected by mats or other covering. Older plants can shrub 3 or 4 feet high if grown in a mild climate.

Teucrium marum has a similar effect on cats to catnip.

Taxonomy 
Teucrium mare is part of a complex of three subspecies : 
 T. marum subsp. marum
 T. marum subsp. occidentale
 T. marum subsp. drosocalyx
Quantitative and qualitative differences in the  volatile components within and between taxa have been found.

References 
 Plants for a future
 Volatile components variation in the Teucrium marum complex (Lamiaceae) from the Balearic Island

marum
Plants described in 1753
Cat attractants
Taxa named by Carl Linnaeus